A space pirate is a stock character in science fiction who conducts piracy in space.

Space Pirate may also refer to:

The Space Pirate, a novel by Jack Vance, also titled The Five Gold Bands
Space Pirates (novel), the eighth book in the Ryder Hook series
Space Pirates (2007 TV series), a children's television series on CBeebies
The Space Pirates, a 1969 serial of Doctor Who
"Space Pirates", a song by Alice Cooper
 Space Pirates (Metroid), one of the main antagonists and species of the Metroid video game series
Space Pirates (laserdisc video game), a 1992 light gun Laserdisc video game
KC Space Pirates, a Kansas City (KC) space-elevator competition team
Harlock: Space Pirate, a 2013 animated film

See also

 
 
Sky pirate (disambiguation)